Rookwood Hospital is a rehabilitation hospital situated in Llandaff, in the city of Cardiff in South Wales. It is managed by Cardiff and Vale University Health Board.

History
Rookwood was built for Colonel Sir Edward Hill in 1886; he, and subsequently Lady Hill, lived there until 1917. The name 'Rookwood' was given to the house during its course of construction by Lady Hill. Before her marriage she was brought to see the building operations and was asked to find a suitable name for it. When she came to the property a number of rooks were flying overhead and she immediately thought of 'Rookwood', and decided that should be the name.

In 1918 Rookwood was taken over for use as a convalescent home. At the end of the First World War it was purchased by Sir Lawrence Phillips and presented to the ministry as a home for Welsh paraplegic pensioner cases. After this it was used by the University Hospital of Wales. In 1932, after being extended, it became a general hospital. During the 1970s and 1980s Rookwood had eight wards caring for people with spinal injuries, brain injury, stroke, multiple sclerosis, and Parkinson's disease.

The hospital gardens and grounds are Cadw/ICOMOS Register of  Parks and Gardens of Special Historic Interest in Wales.

Services
Rookwood provides specialist neurological and spinal rehabilitation services.

Hospital radio
Rookwood Hospital is the home to Rookwood Sound Hospital Radio, which broadcasts at the site and to the University Hospital Llandough and is where radio presenter Huw Stephens began his career at 14.

References

External links
 Rookwood Hospital

Cardiff and Vale University Health Board
Houses completed in 1886
NHS hospitals in Wales
Hospitals in Cardiff
Hospitals established in 1918
Registered historic parks and gardens in Cardiff